The 2011 Rai Open was a professional tennis tournament played on clay courts. It was the third edition of the tournament which was part of the 2011 ATP Challenger Tour. It took place in Rome, Italy between 11 and 17 April 2011.

ATP entrants

Seeds

 Rankings are as of April 4, 2011.

Other entrants
The following players received wildcards into the singles main draw:
  Thomas Fabbiano
  Alessandro Giannessi
  Thomas Muster
  Gianluca Naso

The following players received entry from the qualifying draw:
  Pablo Carreño Busta
  Pavol Červenák
  Boris Pašanski
  Cedrik-Marcel Stebe
  Nikola Mektić (as a lucky loser)

Champions

Singles

 Thomas Schoorel def.  Martin Kližan, 7–5, 1–6, 6–3

Doubles

 Martin Kližan /  Alessandro Motti def.  Thomas Fabbiano /  Walter Trusendi, 7–6(3), 6–4

References
Official Website
ITF search
ATP official site

Rai Open
Clay court tennis tournaments
Rai Open